Retinol dehydrogenase 12 is an enzyme that in humans is encoded by the RDH12 gene.

Retinoids are indispensable light-sensitive elements of vision and also serve as essential modulators of cellular differentiation and proliferation in diverse cell types. RDH12 belongs to a family of dual-specificity retinol dehydrogenases that metabolize both all-trans- and cis-retinols (Haeseleer et al., 2002).[supplied by OMIM]

References

Further reading